Salicylic aldehyde (2-hydroxybenzaldehyde) is the organic compound with the formula    (C7 H6 O2) C6H4CHO-2-OH. Along with 3-hydroxybenzaldehyde and 4-hydroxybenzaldehyde, it is one of the three isomers of hydroxybenzaldehyde. This colorless oily liquid has a bitter almond odor at higher concentration. Salicylaldehyde is a key precursor to a variety chelating agents, some of which are commercially important.

Production 
Salicylaldehyde is prepared from phenol and chloroform by heating with sodium hydroxide or potassium hydroxide in a Reimer–Tiemann reaction:

Alternatively, it is produced by condensation of phenol or its derivatives with formaldehyde to give hydroxybenzyl alcohol, which is oxidized to the aldehyde.

Salicylaldehydes in general may be prepared by other ortho-selective formylation reactions from the corresponding phenol, for instance by the Duff reaction, or by treatment with paraformaldehyde in the presence of magnesium chloride and a base.

Natural occurrences 
Salicylaldehyde was identified as a characteristic aroma component of buckwheat.

It is also one of the components of castoreum, the exudate from the castor sacs of the mature North American beaver (Castor canadensis) and the European beaver (Castor fiber), used in perfumery.

Furthermore, salicylaldehyde occurs in the larval defensive secretions of several leaf beetle species that belong the subtribe Chrysomelina. An example for a leaf beetle species that produces salicylaldehyde is the red poplar leaf beetle Chrysomela populi.

Reactions and applications 
Salicylaldehyde is used to make the following:

Oxidation with hydrogen peroxide gives catechol (1,2-dihydroxybenzene) (Dakin reaction). 
Etherification with chloroacetic acid followed by cyclisation gives the heterocycle benzofuran (coumarone). {The first step in this reaction to the substituted benzofuran is called the Rap–Stoermer condensation after E. Rap (1895) and R. Stoermer (1900).
Salicylaldehyde is converted to chelating ligands by condensation with amines. With ethylenediamine, it condenses to give the ligand salen. Hydroxylamine gives salicylaldoxime. 
Condensation with diethyl malonate gives 3-carbethoxycoumarin (a derivative of coumarin) by an aldol condensation.

References 

Flavors
Hydroxybenzaldehydes